Louisa High School is a historic high school building located at Louisa, Louisa County, Virginia. It was designed by noted Richmond architect Charles M. Robinson and built in 1907, as a 1 1/2-story, stone building. About 1916, a second story was added along with an auditorium addition to the rear. Early in 1924 a fire gutted the building, leaving only the granite walls. It was rebuilt in its two-story configuration in 1925. The school served as an elementary school after 1940, and closed in 1987.  The building was restored starting in 2002, and reopened in 2006 as a town hall, art gallery, and performing arts center.

It was listed on the National Register of Historic Places in 2011.

References

School buildings on the National Register of Historic Places in Virginia
School buildings completed in 1907
Schools in Louisa County, Virginia
National Register of Historic Places in Louisa County, Virginia
1907 establishments in Virginia